The Tenth Amendment of the Constitution Act 1987 (previously bill no. 8 of 1987) is an amendment to the Constitution of Ireland that permitted the state to ratify the Single European Act. It was approved by referendum on 26 May 1987 and signed into law on 22 June of the same year.

Background
The Single European Act (SEA) was signed in February 1986 by the member states of the European Economic Community. It amended the Treaty of Rome and established the European Single Market. The European Communities (Amendment) Act 1986 was passed to allow provisions of the SEA to become part of domestic Irish law. On 22 December 1986, Raymond Crotty sought an injunction preventing Minister for Foreign Affairs Peter Barry from ratifying the Treaty on behalf of the state. He was refused relief by Donal Barrington in the High Court but was successful in part in the Supreme Court. In a majority judgment delivered in Crotty v. An Taoiseach, the Court held that Title III of the SEA would bind the State to concede part of its sovereignty in a manner not permitted by the Constitution under the amendment made in 1972 to allow accession to the European Communities. In response, the newly elected government of Taoiseach Charles Haughey proposed an amendment to the constitution.

Changes to the text
Amendment to Article 29.4.3º by the addition of the text in bold (emphasis added):

Oireachtas debates
The Tenth Amendment of the Constitution Bill 1987 was proposed in the Dáil by Taoiseach Charles Haughey on 22 April 1987 on behalf of the minority Fianna Fáil government. It was also supported by Fine Gael, who had negotiated the SEA during the previous government. At Second Stage, it passed by 108 votes to 29, where was opposed by the Progressive Democrats, the Labour Party, the Workers' Party, and independent TDs Neil Blaney and Tony Gregory. It passed Final Stages in the Dáil on 24 April by 123 votes to 17, on this occasion with the Progressive Democrats supporting its passage. It passed the Seanad on 25 April and proceeded to a referendum.

Campaign
As well as the parties above, the SEA was also supported by employers' and farmers' organisations.

Result

Aftermath
The Single European Act came into effect on 1 July 1987 after Ireland had ratified it.

Because of the decision of the Supreme Court in Crotty, the constitution needed to be amended on every further occasion before a treaty could be ratified that would transfer sovereignty from the Irish government to a supranational authority. This has occurred on the following occasions:

Maastricht Treaty
Eleventh Amendment of the Constitution of Ireland approved by referendum in 1992
Amsterdam Treaty
Eighteenth Amendment of the Constitution of Ireland approved by referendum in 1998
Rome Statute of the International Criminal Court
Twenty-third Amendment of the Constitution of Ireland approved by referendum in 2001
Nice Treaty
Twenty-fourth Amendment of the Constitution Bill 2001 rejected by referendum in 2001
Twenty-sixth Amendment of the Constitution of Ireland approved by referendum in 2002
Lisbon Treaty
Twenty-eighth Amendment of the Constitution Bill 2008 rejected by referendum in 2008
Twenty-eighth Amendment of the Constitution of Ireland approved by referendum in 2009
European Fiscal Compact
Thirtieth Amendment of the Constitution of Ireland approved by referendum in 2012

See also
Politics of the Republic of Ireland
History of the Republic of Ireland

References

External links
European Communities (Amendment) Act 1986
Tenth Amendment of the Constitution Act 1987
Full text of the Constitution of Ireland

1987 in international relations
1987 in Irish law
1987 in Irish politics
1987 referendums
10
Ireland Amendments of the Constitution
Ireland and the European Union
10b
Ireland, 10
May 1987 events in Europe
Amendment, 10, 1987